The Isle of Wight, an island off the south coast of England, was part of the historic county of Hampshire (originally Southamptonshire), and was linked with it for parliamentary purposes until 1832, when it became a county constituency in its own right as it had also been during the Protectorate (1654–1659). Hampshire (including the Isle of Wight), located in the 21st century region of South East England, was represented in Parliament from the 13th century. This article provides a list of constituencies constituting the Parliamentary representation from Isle of Wight.

In 1890 the Isle of Wight became an administrative county. In 1974 it became a new non-metropolitan county and in 1995 a ceremonial county and unitary authority (with unchanged boundaries).

The first part of this article covers the constituencies wholly within the area of the Isle of Wight. The second part refers to the constituency of Hampshire, which included some territory from the Isle of Wight 1290–1654 and 1659–1832. The summaries section only refers to the constituencies included in the first section of the constituency list.

List of constituencies
Article names are followed by (UK Parliament constituency). The constituencies which existed in 1707 were those previously represented in the Parliament of England.

Key to abbreviations:-
 (Type) BC Borough constituency, CC County constituency.
 (County in Notes) H historic county of Hampshire (to 1832), IW1 parliamentary county of the Isle of Wight (1832–1890), IW2 administrative/non-metropolitan/ceremonial and unitary county of the Isle of Wight (from 1890).

Constituencies wholly in the Isle of Wight

Mostly mainland constituency including the Isle of Wight

Periods constituencies represented

Summaries

Summary of Constituencies by Type and Period

Summary of members of parliament by Type and Period

See also
 Wikipedia:Index of article on UK Parliament constituencies in England
 Wikipedia:Index of articles on UK Parliament constituencies in England N-Z
 Parliamentary representation by historic counties
 First Protectorate Parliament
 Unreformed House of Commons
 Politics of the Isle of Wight

References

 Boundaries of Parliamentary Constituencies 1885–1972, compiled and edited by F.W.S. Craig (Parliamentary Reference Publications 1972)
 British Parliamentary Constituencies: A Statistical Compendium, by Ivor Crewe and Anthony Fox (Faber and Faber 1984)
 British Parliamentary Election Results 1832–1885, compiled and edited by F.W.S. Craig (The Macmillan Press 1977)
 The House of Commons 1509–1558, by S.T. Bindoff (Secker & Warburg 1982)
 The House of Commons 1558–1603, by P.W. Hasler (HMSO 1981)
 The House of Commons 1660–1690, by Basil Duke Henning (Secker & Warburg 1983)
 The House of Commons 1715–1754, by Romney Sedgwick (HMSO 1970)
 The House of Commons 1754–1790, by Sir Lewis Namier and John Brooke (HMSO 1964)
 The House of Commons 1790–1820, by R.G. Thorne (Secker & Warburg 1986)
 The Parliaments of England by Henry Stooks Smith (1st edition published in three volumes 1844–50), second edition edited (in one volume) by F.W.S. Craig (Political Reference Publications 1973) out of copyright

Isle of Wight
Politics of the Isle of Wight